Stoibrax is a genus of flowering plants belonging to the family Apiaceae.

Its native range is Spain, Northern Africa.

Species
Species:

Stoibrax dichotomum 
Stoibrax hanotei 
Stoibrax pomelianum

References

Apioideae
Apioideae genera